Aarón Hernán (20 November 1930 – 26 April 2020) was a Mexican telenovela and film actor.

He had a medal called General Ángel Trías Álvarez.

Biography

Family 
Aarón Hernán was born on 20 November 1930, in Camargo, Chihuahua, Mexico as Aarón Hernández Rodríguez.

His mother was Amadita Rodríguez and his father was José de la Luz Hernández. His brother is named Héctor Hernández.

Hernán married Edith Sánchez, with whom he had two children, son Aarón and daughter Edith.

Career

Telenovelas 
Hernán is very known for his roles in telenovelas.

His best-known role was that of an old Don Alonso in Marisol. The main character was lovely Marisol, Alonso's granddaughter, played by Erika Buenfil. Alonso’s son Leonardo was played by famous Enrique Álvarez Félix, who died soon after he made his last work in Marisol.

Another notable role is that of Father Augusto in Tormenta en el paraíso.

He also played priests in some other telenovelas.

Films 

Hernán appeared in Apolinar, a fantasy drama film and Black Wind.

Selected filmography
 The Garden of Aunt Isabel (1971)

Death 

He died on 26 April 2020, aged 89, from acute myocardial infarction while recovering from hip surgery.

See also 
List of Sortilegio characters

Sources 

1930 births
2020 deaths
Male actors from Chihuahua (state)
People from Camargo, Chihuahua
Mexican male telenovela actors
Mexican male film actors